The Papua New Guinea National Rugby League Competition (or the PNGNRL for short, for sponsorship reasons the PNGNRL Digicel Cup) is a semi-professional rugby league competition held annually in Papua New Guinea. Changes in Sponorship have meant it was Formerly known as the SP Inter-City Cup or SP Cup (1990–2008) and later the Bemobile Cup (2009–2010). The current competition is sponsored by pacific telecommunications giant Digicel and so it is currently called the Digicel Cup.

History 
Previous to 2005 the PNG NRL was called the SP Inter-City Cup. The national competition was known as the SP Cup, and has been held since 1990. No competition was held in 2004 due to financial problems and province violence in certain provinces. But the competition returned for 2005 season as the new-look PNGNRL. Much like the new PNGNRL format the old SP Inter-City Cup had teams competing in a format much like the Australian National Rugby League format, with the top four clubs at the end of the rounds entering play-offs, culminating in a Grand Final held in the capital city Port Moresby.

The 2005 season had eight teams in total from all around Papua New Guinea. In 2006 one team got relegated (Monier Broncos) to make way for two new teams, Central Raiders and Pagini Warriors. The inaugural winner of the competition was the Agmark Gurias who beat the Brian Bell Bulldogs in Port Moresby. In the short history of the tournament the competition has shown high levels of rugby league play in Papua New Guinea.

In 2009 local mobile telecommunication Company, Bemobile, took over from SP Brewery as the competitions major sponsor. Currently 9 teams compete in the competition.

On February 9, 2011, telecommucations company Digicel who has taken over the industry in PNG since its operation started in 2007, announced that it will be sponsoring PNG's premier sporting event for the next five years.

Sponsorship Names 
 SP Inter-City Cup – (1990–2008)
 Bemobile Cup – (2009–10)
 Digicel Cup – (2011–present)

Teams

History of Premiers

 Competition not held that year
 Vipers win by virtue of scoring more tries

Performance by team

See also

References

External links

Rugby league in Papua New Guinea
Oceanian rugby league competitions
Sports leagues established in 1990